RMG is an American Christian Hip Hop group signed to Reflection Music Group. The group actively consists of four rappers Derek Minor, Canon, Tony Tillman, Byron Juane, and Deraj In 2012, the group broke through on the Billboard charts with their album Welcome to the Family that was released on March 27, 2012.

Background
The Christian hip hop group, R.M.G. started in 2012, and they are made up of six Christian hip hop artists, Derek Minor, Chad Jones, Canon, Tony Tillman, B. Cooper, Byron Juane and Deraj.

History
R.M.G. released Welcome to the Family, with Reflection Music Group, on March 27, 2012, and the album charted on three Billboard charts.

Members
 Canon
 Derek Minor
 Tony Tillman
 Byron Juane
 Deraj

Former Members
 B. Cooper
 Chad Jones

Discography

Studio albums

References

Musical groups established in 2012
Christian hip hop groups
American hip hop groups
2012 establishments in the United States